"I Remember Yesterday" is a song by American singer and songwriter Donna Summer released from her very successful 1977 album. Upon its release as a single it became a hit in Europe, reaching #14 in the UK and #20 in the Netherlands. The album also contained a reprise of the track (which in some nations was found on the B-side of the 7" single).

A Lithuanian rendering entitled "Aš Prisimenu Vakarykščią Dieną" was recorded in 1982 by Janina Miščiukaitė (lt). In 2018, the song was included in the Broadway musical Summer: The Donna Summer Musical.

Weekly charts

See also
 List of National Disco Action number ones of 1977

References

External links
 
 

Donna Summer songs
1977 singles
1977 songs
Songs written by Pete Bellotte
Songs written by Giorgio Moroder
Songs written by Donna Summer
Casablanca Records singles
Song recordings produced by Giorgio Moroder
Song recordings produced by Pete Bellotte
Songs about nostalgia